Olivier Bernard, known as the Pharmafist (Le Pharmachien), is a Canadian science communicator who uses cartoons to counter pseudo-scientific myths. He writes the Pharmafist blog, the Pharmachien books and produces the television program Les aventures du pharmachien, denouncing ineffective or dangerous treatments.

Early life, family and education 

Bernard earned his B.Pharm. in 2004 from Université Laval in Quebec City. He subsequently completed, in 2006, a master's degree in pharmacogenetics and worked for some time in the pharmaceutical industry.

Career
Bernard started working as a pharmacist after receiving his  bachelor's degree in 2004. However, disillusioned by the industry's business practices, Bernard quit working as a pharmacist full-time in 2013.

There was a constant conflict between the commercial side and pharmaceutics.

He still works as a part-time pharmacist  but focuses working as a scientific communicator. He writes books, produces a television program and gives conferences.

He comments on medicine and pseudoscience on lepharmachien.com (in French) since 2012 and in English on thepharmafist.com, since 2016. Bernard uses a colourful style, described by emergency physician Alain Vadeboncoeur as "friendly, but confident, perhaps a little of a smart-ass", but "he does not attack people, only practices, ideas and concepts." As a science communicator, Bernard says he's influenced by Vadeboncoeur, as well as astrophysicists Hubert Reeves and Neil deGrasse Tyson.

Web activity
Through his website, the Pharmafist aims to "destroy scientific myths and health beliefs and (...) encourages people to develop critical thinking and to make better choices about vaccines, gluten, nutritional complements, sugar or useless cold medicines."

In March 2019, Bernard was targeted by an intimidation and doxing campaign from groups supporting the use of vitamin C injections as a treatment for cancer, after demonstrating this practice promoted by alternative medicine practitioners is not supported by scientific evidence. He publicly denounced the degree of hostility unleashed on him and his spouse.

In 2017, his French Facebook page had 144,000 subscribers. The lepharmachien.com website logged 350,000 visits per month.

"One question I often ask myself is: Just how much must I make the content accessible? (...) Reaching a good balance between a short, punchy text and rigorous content is always a challenge." - Olivier Bernard, the Pharmafist

Books

Television series
Three seasons of the documentary series Les aventures du Pharmachien (The Adventures of Pharmafist) have been aired by ICI Explora. They feature Olivier Bernard in his role as the Pharmafist, offering a scientific viewpoint on health care, through experiments, interviews, cartoons and humour. Bernard is identified as host and content producer of the program for DATSIT Studios.

In the program, Bernard experiments on himself with many treatments he denounces as being ineffective: natural sunscreen, homeopathic solutions, products meant to change the acidity of one's urine.

The initial broadcast of the first episode was seen by a total of 363,000 people on Radio-Canada's various platforms. A second broadcast two days later attracted 43,000 more.

Death of Chantal Lavigne
Bernard released in 2020 an eight-episodes podcast on the 2011 death of Chantal Lavigne, during a New Age sudation workshop. Produced with Radio-Canada, the podcast includes interviews with several people connected to the events leading to the tragedy. Bernard indicated Lavigne's death is one of the reasons started doing science communication.

Distinctions
2014: Prix Sceptique, Les sceptiques du Québec (award from Quebec's Skeptics Association).

2015: Prix Innovation, Ordre des pharmaciens du Québec (Innovation Award from the Order of Pharmacists of Quebec).

2018: Prix Coup de Coeur, ASPQ (award from Quebec's Public Health Association).

2019: John Maddox Prize (early career award) for defending science (award from Nature and Sense about Science)

Personal life
Bernard is from Beauport, which is now a borough of Quebec City. He has been living in Montreal since 2006. He is in a relationship with author India Desjardins. In Winter 2017, Bernard shared with university magazine Contact that starting a family is not out of the question.
I was always a skeptic. (...) I was constantly challenging my parents and my teachers, as early as elementary school. - Olivier Bernard, The Pharmafist

Passionate about the outdoors, Bernard gets his energy from expeditions in nature.

External links
The Pharmafist's official website.

References

Critics of alternative medicine
Science communication
Living people
People from Quebec City
1982 births
Université Laval alumni
Canadian television personalities